Jasper Hamelink (born 12 January 1990) is a Dutch former racing cyclist, who rode professionally between 2011 and 2018 for the  and  teams. He rode at the 2013 UCI Road World Championships.

Major results

2010
 2nd Time trial, National Under-23 Road Championships
2011
 1st Stage 3 (ITT) Tour de Berlin
 2nd Time trial, National Under-23 Road Championships
 5th Time trial, UCI Under-23 Road World Championships
 8th Overall Olympia's Tour
2012
 3rd Ronde van Limburg
 4th Overall Carpathia Couriers Paths
 8th Time trial, UEC European Under-23 Road Championships
 9th Overall Olympia's Tour
 9th Ster van Zwolle
2014
 1st Stage 2 (TTT) Olympia's Tour
2015
 6th Overall Olympia's Tour
 9th Overall Ronde de l'Oise
2016
 1st  Mountains classification Tour du Loir-et-Cher
 3rd Overall Course de Solidarność et des Champions Olympiques
1st Stage 2
 5th Overall Szlakiem Grodów Piastowskich
 7th Overall Bałtyk–Karkonosze Tour
 9th Arno Wallaard Memorial
2017
 10th Overall Course de Solidarność et des Champions Olympiques
 10th Druivenkoers Overijse
2018
 10th Ronde van Midden-Nederland

References

External links

1990 births
Living people
Dutch male cyclists
Sportspeople from Zwolle
UCI Road World Championships cyclists for the Netherlands
Cyclists from Overijssel
20th-century Dutch people
21st-century Dutch people